Vernon Seymour Ransford OBE (20 March 1885 – 19 March 1958) was an Australian cricketer who played in 20 Test matches between 1907 and 1912.

Ransford was a smooth and stylish left-handed batsman who could score with ease all round the wicket or defend patiently as the situation required. He played for Victoria from 1904 to 1928. He was also an outstanding fieldsman, who could pick up and throw the ball in one movement and with great accuracy.

Ransford's best Test series was the 1909 tour of England when he topped the Australian batting averages, helped by a career best score of 143 not out, finishing with 353 runs at an average of 58.83. On the whole tour he made 1783 runs at an average of 43.48, and hit six centuries. The following year he was a Wisden Cricketer of the Year.

He toured New Zealand with Australian teams in 1913-14 and in 1920-21, when he captained the side. He also toured New Zealand with Victoria in 1924-25.

After retiring from playing Ransford served as President of the Melbourne Football Club in 1927/28, and secretary of the Melbourne Cricket Club (where he had played his domestic cricket) from 1939 to 1957, ably steering the club and its ground, the Melbourne Cricket Ground, through the ground's use as a military camp in World War II and its later use as the chief venue for the 1956 Summer Olympics. He was awarded the OBE in the 1954 Queen's Birthday Honours.

References

External links

Vernon Seymour Ransford (1885–1958) Gravesite at Brighton General Cemetery (Vic)

1885 births
1958 deaths
Australia Test cricketers
Victoria cricketers
Wisden Cricketers of the Year
Melbourne Cricket Club cricketers
Melbourne Football Club presidents
Australian cricketers
Cricketers from Melbourne
Australian cricket administrators
People from South Yarra, Victoria
Australian Members of the Order of the British Empire